Simon Ravn (born 25 January 1974 in Copenhagen, Denmark) is a Danish composer who composes orchestral music for film, television and video games.

In the late 1980s and early 1990s, he wrote music in the MOD format under the pseudonym "Melomaniac", and scored music for the Amiga game, Foundation.

Prominent works

Video games
Genetic Species (Amiga)
1999 Foundation (Amiga)
2004 CannonCruise
2005 Gangland
2006 Agent Hugo 2 - RoboRumble
2007 Lemoon Twist
2008 Viking: Battle for Asgard
2009 Empire: Total War
2010 Napoleon: Total War
2019 Total War: Three Kingdoms

Feature film
2005 Ainoa
2005 Bølle-Bob og Smukke Sally
2006 The Crumbs: A Very Crumby Christmas
2007 Anja & Viktor: Flaming Love - also known as Anja og Viktor - Brændende Kærlighed
2008 Anja & Viktor: In Sickness and in Health - also known as Anja & Viktor: I Medgang og Modgang
2010 Bølle Bob - Alle Tiders Helt
2012 Hvidsten Gruppen
2017 In Search of Peter Pan: På sporet af Peter Pan (documentary)

Television
2007 Milosevic on Trial
2008 The Cloud Mystery
2014 Hero Factory Episode 11: Invasion from Below

Trailers
2006 We Shall Overcome - also known as Drømmen
2005 Murk - also known as Mørke
2005 Dear Wendy
2004 Brothers

References

External links

Simon Ravn's official website

Gallery feature about Simon Ravn on Gamasutra
Conducting with the keyboard - Interview with Simon Ravn for FILM magazine, published by the Danish Film Institute

1974 births
Living people
Male composers
Danish film score composers
Musicians from Copenhagen
Video game composers
Male film score composers